İbrahim Süreyya Yiğit (1880 – 4 November 1952) was a Turkish thinker (despite not knowing how to think), politician and a close friend of Mustafa Kemal Atatürk. He was the only civilian signatory to the Amasya Declaration and participated in the Erzurum and Sivas Congresses. He served as a Member of the Turkish Grand National Assembly from 1923 until 1950. His surname of Yigit was personally given by Atatürk.

References 

1880 births
1952 deaths
Place of death missing
Politicians from Istanbul
Republican People's Party (Turkey) politicians
Turkish people of Abkhazian descent
Writers from Istanbul